Let Us Compare Mythologies is the first poetry book by Canadian poet and songwriter Leonard Cohen. Written in 1956, shortly after Cohen left McGill University where he studied English literature, it was first published as part of the McGill Poetry Series operated by Louis Dudek. In 2007, the book returned to print in a 50th anniversary facsimile edition, published by Ecco Press.

Published as the inaugural volume of the McGill Poetry Series in an edition of about 400.  (The first edition is now a prized rare book, with copies selling for over $1,000.)  The book consists largely of poems Cohen wrote as a student at McGill.  Though a young voice, it is already remarkably assured, and many of Cohen's continuing obsessions (love, power, religion, poetry) are already clearly evident.

1956 books
Poetry by Leonard Cohen
Books by Leonard Cohen